Wenk is a surname. Notable people with this name include:

Alexandra Wenk (born 1995), German swimmer
Carola Wenk (born 1973), German-American computer scientist
Erich Wenk (1923–2012), German opera singer
Friedrich Wenk, founder of 1920s German aircraft company Weltensegler
Hans-Rudolf Wenk (born 1941), Swiss mineraloger and geophysicist
Karl Wenk (born 1934), German sports shooter
János Wenk (1894–1962), Hungarian swimmer and water polo player
John Wenk (born 1938), British middle-distance runner
Martin Wenk, musician in Calexico (band)
Richard Wenk, American film screenwriter and director
Stefan Wenk (born 1981), German javelin thrower

See also
Wenck
WENK, a radio station in Tennessee

Surnames of German origin
German-language surnames
Surnames of Swiss origin